Nayfeld is a village (selo) in Birobidzhansky District of the Jewish Autonomous Oblast, located  from Birobidzhan.  One of the early Jewish settlements in the area, it was founded in 1928.

The first grave in Nayfeld Cemetery dates back to 1929, a year after the first houses in this village were built. 

In 2003, a Jewish Book Festival took place here.  In 2006, Mordechai Scheiner, the Chief Rabbi of the Jewish Autonomous Oblast, visited the village.

See also
Jews and Judaism in the Jewish Autonomous Oblast

References

Rural localities in the Jewish Autonomous Oblast
Historic Jewish communities
Yiddish culture in Russia
Populated places established in 1928